Abortion in Samoa is only legal if the abortion will save the mother's life or preserve her physical or mental health and only when the gestation period is less than 20 weeks. In Samoa, if an abortion is performed on a woman for any other reason, or if a woman performs a self-induced abortion, the violator is subject to seven years in prison.

History
Samoan abortion law was defined in the Crimes Ordinance 1961 and amended by the Crimes Amendment Act of 1969.

Crimes Ordinance 1961
The Crimes Ordinance 1961 implicitly defined abortion as an action which caused the death of an unborn child and was not taken in good faith for preservation of the life of the mother. This carried a prison term of up to fourteen years if the action was deemed to be murder, or five years if the action was deemed to be manslaughter.

Crimes Amendment Act of 1969
Crimes Amendment Act of 1969 inserted §§ 73A–73D into Crimes Ordinance 1961, explicitly defining abortion and stating that a violator of the following is liable to imprisonment for a term not exceeding seven years.

 Procuring abortion (§§73A)
 Female procuring her own miscarriage (§§73B)
 Supplying means of procuring abortion (§§73C)
 Effectiveness of means used immaterial (§§73D)

Crimes Act 2013
Crimes Ordinance 1961 was replaced by the Crimes Act 2013, stating that the following are illegal and the violator is liable to imprisonment for a term not exceeding seven years:
 Procuring abortion by any means (§112)
 Female procuring her own miscarriage (§113)
 Supplying means of procuring abortion (§114)
 Effectiveness of means used immaterial (§115)

Unless:

Current Events

National HIV, AIDS, and STI Policy 2017–2022
In 2017, the Samoan Ministry of Health produced a document entitled National HIV, AIDS, and STI Policy 2017–2022 containing an analysis of abortion law in the Crimes Act 2013. This argues that the term "serious danger to [...] mental health" would potentially apply to suicide risk, rape, incest, and childhood pregnancy. This analysis clashes with the WHO Abortion Policies Database on the subject. 

The document called for the law the be amended to address abortion for HIV positive women as well as "a legal analysis to assess the law, the interpretation, the inconsistency of case law, and ultimate population access to quality services".

Prime Minister Tuilaepa Lupesoliai Sailele Malielegaoi opposed these recommendations stating

Committee on the Elimination of Discrimination against Women

In 2018, the Committee on the Elimination of Discrimination against Women (CEDAW) recommended that the state party should amend the Crimes Act.

See also
 Abortion law
 Abortion debate
 Religion and abortion
 Societal attitudes towards abortion

References

Further reading 
 

Health in Samoa
Samoa
Samoa